Sankt Anna am Aigen ( Prekmurje Slovene: Sveta Ana pr Igi) is a municipality in the district of Südoststeiermark in the Austrian state of Styria.

Population

References

External links 
 st-anna-aigen.gv.at - city website

Cities and towns in Südoststeiermark District